G.O. ("God's Order") is the sixth studio album by American rapper Krizz Kaliko. The album was released on April 8, 2016, by Strange Music, and it would be has last release with the label. The album features guest appearances from fellow Strange Music artists Tech N9ne, Stevie Stone, Rittz, CES Cru, Wrekonize & JL B.Hood.

Track listing

References

2016 albums
Krizz Kaliko albums
Strange Music albums
Albums produced by J. White Did It